Edward Day Cohota (~1843–1935) was an ethnic Chinese soldier who fought in the American Civil War for the Union Army, and served thirty years of active service. He is one of the few Asian Americans whose life is well documented during his time which provides valuable historical insight.

Early life
Edward Day Cohota's exact date of birth is unknown with many conflicting reports—presumably he was born around 1843 most likely in Shanghai. The earliest account of Edward was on December 27, 1845 when Captain Sialas left Shanghai, China. On his ship named the Cohota, he found two starved ragged Chinese boys. They were two brothers—one a few years older than the other. Both were near the brink of death. The Captain instead of turning back kept them onboard. The older boy died, but the younger survived the voyage. The Captain decided to raise the survivor himself naming him Edward Day Cohota, and December 27 would be his chosen birthday. Edward grew up with the Captain at his home in Gloucester, Massachusetts and with his family who Cohota had a close relationship with for the rest of his life. There he went to school and was trained in the ways of a sailor.

Time as a soldier
On May 16, 1864, Cohota enlisted with the 23rd Massachusetts Infantry of the Potomac Army. He saw action in many battles and skirmishes including Drury's Bluff where reportedly seven bullet holes went through his clothes but none injured him. At Cold Harbor, a bullet grazed his head which left a permanent part in his hair. Cohota was an energetic soldier, and fought bravely and well relishing in combat. With the war concluded, Cohota was discharged and worked as a sailor for a year until reenlisting in the fall of 1866, unwilling to part with a soldier's life.

Cohota would spend the next 30 years mostly in the West as a private serving in Company C and H of the 15th Infantry, and was well respected by his fellow troops and officers. He was stationed in Texas, New Mexico, Fort Sheridan, Illinois,  Fort Randall, and Fort Niobrara, and fought in numerous battles of the American Indian Wars. In 1883, Cohota married Anna Halstensen, a Norwegian woman, at Fort Randall. There too, he reportedly guarded perhaps the greatest Indian chief resistance fighter, Sitting Bull.

Later life
Cohota would retire from the army in August 1895 settling down with his wife and kids in Valentine, Nebraska. Cohota and Anna had six children: Lucy, Edward, Elizabeth, Willian, Daisy, and Miles, who died in infancy. The rest of the children lived well into adulthood. Cohota worked as a baker and ran a livery barn business for a number of years. His wife Anna died in 1898 from illness. Later, Cohota opened one or two restaurants in Valentine, and was well-respected in town.

Cohota's last great battle was with the Federal Government. Though fighting to preserve it in the Civil War and continued as one of its soldier for over thirty years, Cohota was ironically never a citizen of the US. The Chinese Exclusion Act of 1882 made it legally impossible. Cohota had always assumed he was a citizen. In fact, he never missed an election to vote in his public citizen life, and was dismayed when he was informed he was not a citizen in 1912 around age 69. Unable to stand aside, Cohota went before to Congress and to the courts fighting hard until his death even getting the support of Senator Brown, but ended to no avail. Cohota did receive a veteran's pension at least, and showed no ill will against his country that denied him citizenship. In 1917, Cohota retired to a sanitarium for veterans in South Dakota. Still very energetic, he loved to drive and cook for his family. He died on November 18, 1935. His granddaughter recalls him dying on the front porch of the family home at Parmelee, South Dakota, and was later buried with his wife in Valentine.

References 

https://books.google.com/books?id=3AxIAgAAQBAJ&pg=PA325&lpg=PA325&dq=edward+day+cohota+school;&source=bl&ots=_2o7RQ3VUt&sig=ACfU3U1-Vua7OhRC7Q-DHd2FQs3PR_aL7w&hl=en&sa=X&ved=2ahUKEwjGkry1yLrpAhUKrJ4KHc4mBdwQ6AEwEXoECAoQAQ#v=onepage&q=edward%20day%20cohota%20school%3B&f=false
https://sites.google.com/site/accsacw/Home/cohota
https://archive.defense.gov/news/newsarticle.aspx?id=44949
https://books.google.com/books?id=S0FvDwAAQBAJ&pg=PA52&lpg=PA52&dq=edward+day+cohota&source=bl&ots=JKv5l1gmq2&sig=ACfU3U085ALLcejDVwtcZsurDcsQ0fYtkg&hl=en&sa=X&ved=2ahUKEwjWmbi-0brpAhWTuJ4KHdJOA0U4FBDoATACegQICRAB#v=onepage&q=edward%20day%20cohota&f=false

American military personnel of Chinese descent
1935 deaths
Year of birth uncertain